King of the Herd is a 1927 American silent Western film directed by Frank S. Mattison and starring Raymond McKee, Nola Luxford and Bud Osborne. Given an initial release in 1927, it went on a more general release in 1929.

Cast
 White Star the Horse as White Star
 Raymond McKee as Paul Garrison
 Nola Luxford as Nancy Dorance
 Bud Osborne as Barry Kahn
 Laura Miskin
 Billy Franey
 Evelyn Francisco
 Fred Shanley
 Arthur Hotaling
 Eddie Harris
 Hugh Saxon

References

External links
 

1927 films
1927 Western (genre) films
American black-and-white films
Films directed by Frank S. Mattison
Silent American Western (genre) films
1920s English-language films
1920s American films